The 1956 All-Ireland Minor Hurling Championship was the 26th staging of the All-Ireland Minor Hurling Championship since its establishment by the Gaelic Athletic Association in 1928.

Tipperary entered the championship as the defending champions.

On 23 September 1956, Tipperary won the championship following a 4-16 to 1-5 defeat of Kilkenny in the All-Ireland final. This was their second All-Ireland title in-a-row and their tenth title overall.

Results

All-Ireland Minor Hurling Championship

Semi-finals

Final

External links
 All-Ireland Minor Hurling Championship: Roll Of Honour

Minor
All-Ireland Minor Hurling Championship